The 1995 UC Davis football team represented the University of California, Davis as an independent during the 1994 NCAA Division II football season. Led by third-year head coach Bob Biggs, UC Davis compiled a record 6–3–1. 1995 was the 26th consecutive winning season for the Aggies. The team their opponents 332 to 250 for the season. The Aggies played home games at Toomey Field in Davis, California.

Schedule

References

UC Davis
UC Davis Aggies football seasons
UC Davis Aggies football